The Diocese of Tver is an eparchy of the Russian Orthodox Church in Tver Oblast and is one of the oldest dioceses of the Russian Orthodox Church.

History
The Tver diocese separated from the Polotsk diocese at the Grand Prince Yaroslav Yaroslavich no later than 1271. In 1589, it installed an Archdiocese.

Until 1928, it was called the Diocese of Tver and Kashin. From 1928 to 1943 and from 1950 to 1990, it was the Kalinin and Kashin diocese. From 1943 to 1944 - it was the Diocese of Smolensk and Kalinin. From 1944 to 1950  it was Kalinin and Velikiye Luki Diocese, and then the Diocese of Tver and Kashin again since 1990. On December 28, 2011, Dioceses of Bezhetsk and Rzhev were separated from Tver and Kashin, and three all formed a new Metropoly of Tver, covering all Orthodox parishes in Tver Oblast.

Former titles

Bishops

References

Eparchies of the Russian Orthodox Church